The Olynthiacs were three political speeches, all delivered by the Athenian statesman and orator Demosthenes. In 349 BC, Philip II of Macedon attacked Olynthus, which at the time was an ally of Athens. In the Olynthiacs, delivered in 349 BC, Demosthenes urged Athens to help Olynthus.

Historical framework
When Philip was enthroned, he cajoled the  Chalkidian League, but, after the seizure of Amphipolis and the Macedonian expansion in Thrace, Philip sought for the elimination of the Chalkidian League and for the destruction of its most powerful city, Olynthus. The Olynthians foresaw the danger and struck a deal with the Athenians, who had been their enemies. In 350 BC, Philip had already seized thirty-two cities of the Chalkidike. The next year Olynthus sent successive delegations to Athens, asking desperately for military support, but the Athenians displayed no willingness for a military operation far away from their city.

Content of the orations
In the "First Olynthiac", Demosthenes exhorted the Athenians to vote an expedition at once, to make instant preparation for its dispatch and to send ambassadors to state their intentions and watch events. He then proposed the reform of the "theoric fund" ("Theorika" were allowances paid by the state to poor Athenians to enable them to watch dramatic festivals). In the "Second Olynthiac", the orator bluntly expressed his annoyance for the dubious stance of his countrymen and for the fact that they remain idle. He also insisted that Philip was not invincible. In the "Third Olynthiac" he insulted Philip, characterizing him as a "barbarian" and warned his compatriots that the King of Macedon is quick to seize his opportunity, now yielding a point when it suits his purpose. He called for two distinct expeditions; one military force must be dispatched to rescue the Olynthians, and a second force, both naval and military, to ravage Philip's territory. He finally demanded a better utilization of the public money for the attainment of success abroad. Despite Demosthenes' warnings, the Athenians engaged in a useless war in Euboea and offered no military support to Olynthus. When they decided to implement some of his suggestions, the timing was wrong and their troops were inadequate.

Assessments
The "Third Olynthiac" is regarded as the best of the three speeches and one of the best political orations of Demosthenes. It is distinguished because of the boldness of the expressed political ideas and the variety of oratorical means and expressions. All the three Olynthiacs demonstrate the passionate spirit of the Athenian statesman and his fervent desire to motivate his countrymen.

See also
Philippic

References

Works by Demosthenes
Speeches
Ancient Chalcidice
349 BC
Ancient Greek orations